The Birmingham and Warwick Junction Canal is a short canal connecting the Digbeth Branch of the Birmingham and Fazeley Canal in the centre of Birmingham to the Warwick and Birmingham Canal near Gravelly Hill Interchange. It was authorized in 1840 by Act of Parliament to relieve pressure on this connection to the Grand Junction Canal leading to London and opened in 1844. It is 2.5 miles long and has 6 locks.

In 1929 it was bought by the Regent's Canal company to form part of the Grand Union Canal. Like the Camp Hill locks it was not broadened in 1933 as it only led to other narrow canals.

See also

References

Further reading
Canals of Great Britain
History of the British canal system
Waterscape

Canals in the West Midlands (county)
Canals opened in 1844